Biyangdo is an island in South Korea. It is located in the Jeju Province, in the southern part of the country, 500 km south of the capital, Seoul.

References

Islands of Jeju Province